Elmo-MIT is a 1960s bronze sculpture by Dimitri Hadzi, installed on the Massachusetts Institute of Technology campus, in Cambridge, Massachusetts, United States.

References

External links
 Elmo-MIT, 1963 at cultureNOW

1963 sculptures
Bronze sculptures in Massachusetts
Massachusetts Institute of Technology campus
Outdoor sculptures in Cambridge, Massachusetts